The Parliamentary Under-Secretary of State for Housing and Homelessness is a junior position in the Department for Levelling Up, Housing and Communities in the British government. It is currently held by Felicity Buchan.

Officeholders 

 Luke Hall
 Kelly Tolhurst
 Eddie Hughes
 Andrew Stephenson
 Felicity Buchan

Shadow Ministers 

 Sarah Owen

References 

Department for Levelling Up, Housing and Communities
Housing ministers of the United Kingdom